Dual specificity mitogen-activated protein kinase kinase 5 is an enzyme that in humans is encoded by the MAP2K5 gene.

Function 

The protein encoded by this gene is a dual specificity protein kinase that belongs to the MAP kinase kinase family. This kinase specifically interacts with and activates MAPK7/ERK5. This kinase itself can be phosphorylated and activated by MAP3K3/MEKK3, as well as by atypical protein kinase C isoforms (aPKCs). The signal cascade mediated by this kinase is involved in growth factor stimulated cell proliferation and muscle cell differentiation. Four alternatively spliced transcript variants of this gene encoding distinct isoforms have been described.

Upstream

This kinase itself can be phosphorylated and activated by MAP3K3/MEKK3, as well as by atypical protein kinase C isoforms (aPKCs).

Downstream

This kinase specifically interacts with and activates MAPK7/ERK5.

Interactions 

MAP2K5 has been shown to interact with MAPK7, MAP3K2, Protein kinase Mζ and MAP3K3.

References

Further reading 

 
 
 
 
 
 
 
 
 
 
 
 
 
 
 
 
 

EC 2.7.12